Cross-linking may refer to 

Cross-link, a chemical bond of one polymer chain to another
Corneal collagen cross-linking, a parasurgical treatment for corneal ectasia and keratoconus